Livaja is a surname. Notable people with the surname include:

 Marko Livaja (born 1993), Croatian football player
 Roman Livaja (born 1974), Swedish taekwondo practitioner

Croatian surnames
Slavic-language surnames
Patronymic surnames